3 Will Be Free (3 Will Be Free – ) is a 2019 Thai television series starring Lapassalan Jiravechsoontornkul (Mild), Way-Ar Sangngern (Joss) and Tawan Vihokratana (Tay).

Directed by Tidakorn Pookaothong and produced by GMMTV together with Trasher Bangkok, the series was one of the thirteen television series for 2019 launched by GMMTV during their "Wonder Th13teen" event on 5 November 2018. It premiered on One31 and LINE TV on 9 August 2019, airing on Fridays at 22:30 ICT and 23:30 ICT, respectively. The series concluded on 11 October 2019.

Synopsis 
Neo (Way-Ar Sangngern), a bisexual male stripper/prostitute, begins an affair with Vanika (Inthira Charoenpura), a famous actress and the second wife of Sia Thana (Sarut Vichitrananda), a real estate mogul and mob kingpin. Phon (Natthawut Jenmana) and Ter (Chanagun Arpornsutinan), the two hitmen working for Thana, are tasked to kill Neo and punish Vanika. Upon finding the pair, Ter tries to shoot Neo, but accidentally shoots and kills Vanika instead. Neo runs to the strip club where he works and is followed by Phon; earlier, Shin (Tawan Vihokratana), Thana's only son who happens to be a reluctant heir of his father's mob empire, comes to the same bar with his friends and meets Miw (Lapassalan Jiravechsoontornkul), a hostess at the bar. Shin's friends pay Miw to sleep with Shin (unbeknownst to them, Shin is gay, and doesn't actually sleep with Miw). Afterwards, Shin and Miw both return to the bar. In the bathroom, Shin runs into Neo, who is hiding from Phon, and who has apparently met Shin before (this is revealed later in the series). Phon discovers them, but is stopped by Miw, who accidentally shoots and kills Phon.  Neo, Miw, and Shin escape together and begin a harrowing journey that takes them from a seedy Bangkok motel, to the jungle and to the ocean as they try to evade those who are trying to find them.

Phon's death devastates not only Ter, but Phon's lover, Mae (Watchara Sukchum), a transgender female waitress who has long wanted Phon to leave the life of a gangster. Mae and Ter vow to take revenge on Phon's killers and follow the trio to the jungle, where they are hiding out with the assistance of Leo (Suphakorn Sriphothong), Neo's brother. The trio also seeks refuge in Miw's hometown and receives help from her ex-boyfriend, Luang (Pumipat Paiboon), while simultaneously dealing with Boss John, a mob leader in direct conflict with Thana, and the brother of Miw's step-father (who had tried to rape her years earlier and was accidentally killed by Miw). As their survival adventure continues, the trio develop strong feelings of friendship and loyalty towards each other with Neo, Miw, and Shin finding themselves in a romantic relationship. By the end of the series, all three must face the repercussions of their actions and the actions of others.

Cast and characters 
Below are the cast of the series:

Main 
 Lapassalan Jiravechsoontornkul (Mild) as Miw
 Way-Ar Sangngern (Joss) as Neo
 Tawan Vihokratana (Tay) as Shin

Supporting 
 Watchara Sukchum (Jennie) as Mae
 Chanagun Arpornsutinan (Gunsmile) as Tur
 Natthawut Jenmana (Max) as Phon
 Pumipat Paiboon (Prame) as Luang
 Suphakorn Sriphothong (Pod) as Leo (Neo's brother)
 Jirakit Kuariyakul (Toptap) as PP
 Sivakorn Lertchoochot (Guy) as Touch
 Harit Cheewagaroon (Sing) as James
 Naphon Phromsuwan (Stop) as Boss John
 Sarut Vichitrananda (Big) as Sia Thana
 Inthira Charoenpura as Vanika (Thana's Wife)
 Sarocha Watitapun (Tao)
 Penpak Sirikul as Miw's mother
 Arisara Wongchalee (Fresh)
 Krittanai Arsalprakit (Nammon) as Ken

Guest role 
 Theepisit Mahaneeranon (Frame)
 Pronpiphat Pattanasettanon (Plustor) as Nurse/Hitman

Soundtrack

Awards and nominations

References

External links 
 3 Will Be Free on One31 website 
 3 Will Be Free  on LINE TV
 
 GMMTV

Television series by GMMTV
Thai LGBT-related television shows
2019 Thai television series debuts
2019 Thai television series endings
One 31 original programming
2010s LGBT-related drama television series
Thai action television series
Television series by Trasher Bangkok